Huaihua South railway station is a railway station of Shanghai–Kunming high-speed railway and Huaihua–Shaoyang–Hengyang railway located in Hunan, People's Republic of China. It is also the southern terminus of the Zhangjiajie–Jishou–Huaihua high-speed railway.

History
The station opened with the Changsha–Kunming section of the Shanghai–Kunming high-speed railway on 16 December 2014.

See also
Huaihua railway station

References

Railway stations in Hunan
Railway stations in China opened in 2014
Railway stations in Huaihua